The Sawiris Cultural Award is an Egyptian literary prize, awarded annually by the Sawiris Foundation for Social Development. It was inaugurated in 2005 with prizes in two categories: novels and short stories. Since then, additional categories in screenplays and playwriting have been added. Each award is also divided into two sub-categories: senior writers and junior writers.

Winners

2022

Novel

 Abel Assad Merry, The Fabric threads of the Self

 Mohamed Abu-Zeid, A Spider in the Heart

Short Stories

 Ossama Habachi, Try not to see me
 Mohamed Abdel-Naby, Once Upon A Time

2011 (7th round)

Novel
 Ibrahim Abdel-Meguid, In Every Week There Is a Friday, Senior Writers
 Mohammed Rabie, Amber Planet, Young Writers / First Place
 Mohamed Salah al-Azab, Sidi Barani, Young Writers / Second Place

Short stories
 Ahmed El-Khamissi, Canary, Senior Writers
 Tareq Imam, The Story of a Man: Whenever He Dreams of a City, He Dies In It, Young Writers / First Place
 Sherif Saleh, Love Triangle, Young Writers / Second Place

Screenplay
 none awarded in Senior Writers category
 Mohammed Salah al-Azab, Two-Bedroom Apartment (adapted from the original novel by Ibrahim Aslan), Young Writers

Playwriting
 Imad Motawie, Insomniacs

2010 (6th round)

Novel
 Ahmed Sabry Abul-Futuh, The Saraswa Epic: Genesis, Volume 1, Senior Writers
 Al-Taher Sharkawi, Vanilla, Young Writers / First Place
 Manal El-Sayed, The Singing of the Crazy, Young Writers / Second Place
 Mohamed Maarouf, The Boat Cleopatra, Young Writers / Second Place

Short stories
 Mahmoud El-Wardani, A Morning Party, Senior Writers
 Mohamed Abdel-Nabi, Anton Chekov’s Ghost, Young Writers / First Place
 Mohamed Khair, Ghosts of the Radio, Young Writers / Second Place
 Ahmed Hemdan, The Delegation, Young Writers / Second Place

2009

Novel
 Montaser El-Qafash, Masaalet Waqt, Senior Writers
 Reem Basyouni, Dr. Hanaa, Young Writers / First Place
 Hani Abel-Moreed, Kirialison, Young Writers / Second Place

Short Stories
 Hanaa Attia, Onf Al-Zel, Senior Writers
 Muhammad Fathy, Begwar Ragol A’refaho, Young Writers / First Place
 Hasan Kamal Mahmoud, Koshari  Masr, Young Writers / Second Place

Screenplay
 Esam Helmy Rahim, Niran Sadiqa, Senior Writers
 Ahmad Nabil Tawfik, El-Feel El-Nono El-Ghalabawi, Young Writers

Playwriting
 Mansour Mekawy, Ekhnatoun
 Ahmad Al-Attar, El-Hayah Helwa

2008

Novel
 Muhammad Albosaty, Daq Altubool, Senior Writers
 Hedra Gerges Zakhari, Mawaqeet Alta’ari, Young Writers / First Place
 Tareq Imam, Hedo’a  Alkatalah, Young Writers / Second Place

Short Stories
 Hossam Ahmed Fakhr, Hekayat Amina, Senior Writers
 Sherif M. Abdelmeguid Saleh, Khadamat Mabad Al Bayie, Young Writers / First Place
 Basma M. Abd el Aziz, Alashan Rabena Ysahel, Young Writers / Second Place

Screenplay
 Hasan Abdel-Rahman (El Nouni), Al Gotha Raqam 13, Senior Writers
 Gyhan Seliman, Al nouras valentine, Young Writers

2007

Novel
 Muhammad Youssef AlQaeed, Qesmat Alghorama’a, Senior Writers
 Ahmad Abou Khnegar, Elamma Okht Alrigal, Young Writers / First Place
 Ehab Abd el hamid, Oshaq kha’eboon, Young Writers / Second Place

Short Stories
 Muhammad Kamal, Aqasis Masrya, Senior Writers
 Gamal Zaki Maqar, Sefr Altufula Wa Nassri Wa Al homar, Senior Writers
 Mohammed Okasha, Asdaa Bela Aswat, Young Writers / First Place
 Eman Abd el Hamid, Mohawalat leltakhafy, Young Writers / Second Place
 Alaa Ahmad Abou zaid, Al haffah, Young Writers / Second Place

Screenplay
 Dawood Abdelsayed Dawood, Rasa’al Albahr, Senior Writers
 Gamal Sedki Youssef, Al Hayat Helwa, Senior Writers
 Mariam Na3om, Wahd/Sefr, Young Writers

2006

Novel
 Muhammad Almansi Qandil, Kamar Ali Samarqand, Senior Writers
 Hamdi Algazzar, Sehr Aswad, Young Writers / First Place
 Ahmad Alaidi, An Takon Abbas Alabd, Young Writers / Second place

Short Stories
 Ibrahim Aslan, Hekayat Men Fadlallah Othman, Senior Writers
 Mustafa Zekry, Mera’at  202, Young Writers / First Place
 Wael Elashry, Sa’am New York, Young Writers / Second Place

2005

Novel
 Haggag Hasan Adol, Ma3touk El kheir, Senior Writers
 Yasser Abd el latif, Qanoun Elweratha, Young Writers / 1st Place
 Hasan Abd el mawgoud, Ain Al kott, Young Writers / 2nd Place

Short Stories
 Mohammed Al Makhzangy, Awtar Al maa, Senior Writers
 Haytham Alwardany, Gam3at Aladab Alnaqis, Young Writers / 1st Place
 Nessma Youssef Edrees, Malek Wala Ketaba, Young Writers / 2nd Place

References

Egyptian literary awards
Arabic literary awards